Mahendranagar Airport   is a domestic airport located in Mahendranagar  serving Kanchanpur District, a district in Sudurpashchim Province in Nepal. It is the main tourist gateway to Shuklaphanta National Park.

History
The airport started operations on 30 December 1973, but has been out of operation since 1999 and has turned into a grazing field for animals.

Facilities

Airlines and destinations
Currently, there are no scheduled services to and from Mahendranagar Airport.

See also
List of airports in Nepal

References

External links
 

Airports in Nepal
Buildings and structures in Sudurpashchim Province
1973 establishments in Nepal